Yacine Akhnouche is a joint citizen of France and Algeria who was alleged to having ties with Al Qaeda.

Akhnouche's alleged Al Qaeda associates include:

Akhnouche was convicted and received an eight-year sentence for his role in planning the Strasbourg Cathedral bombing plot.

References 

Islamic terrorism in France
Algerian al-Qaeda members
French people of Algerian descent
Living people
French al-Qaeda members
Year of birth missing (living people)